The Elamo-Dravidian language family is a hypothesised language family that links the Brahui language of Pakistan, and the Dravidian languages of Southern India, to the extinct Elamite language of ancient Elam (present-day southwestern Iran). Linguist David McAlpin has been a chief proponent of the Elamo-Dravidian hypothesis. The hypothesis has gained attention in academic circles, but has been subject to serious criticism by linguists, and remains only one of several scenarios for the origins of the Dravidian languages. Elamite is generally accepted by scholars to be a language isolate, unrelated to any other known language.

History of the proposal
The concept that Elamite and Dravidian are in some way related dates from the beginnings of both fields in the early nineteenth century. Edwin Norris was the first to publish an article in support of the hypothesis in 1853. Further evidence was proposed by Robert Caldwell when he published a comparative linguistics book in 1856 about the Dravidian languages. David McAlpin, assistant professor  of Dravidian languages and linguistics at the University of Pennsylvania, published a series of papers providing evidence supporting the theory. He also speculated that the Harappan language (the language of the Indus Valley civilization) might also have been part of this family.

Linguistic arguments
According to David McAlpin, the Dravidian languages were brought to present day Pakistan by immigration from the Middle East via Elam, located in present-day southwestern Iran. McAlpin (1975) in his study identified some similarities between Elamite and Dravidian. He proposed that 20% of Dravidian and Elamite vocabulary are cognates while 12% are probable cognates. He further claimed that Elamite and Dravidian possess similar second-person pronouns and parallel case endings. They have a number of similar derivatives, abstract nouns, and the same verb stem+tense marker+personal ending structure. Both have two positive tenses, a "past" and a "non-past".

Reception
The hypothesis has gained attention in academic circles but is difficult to assess due to the limited resources on the Elamite language. Supporters of the Elamo-Dravidian hypothesis include Igor M. Diakonoff and Franklin Southworth.

Bhadriraju Krishnamurti regarded McAlpin's proposed morphological correspondences between Elamite and Dravidian to be ad hoc, and found them to be lacking phonological motivation. Similar criticisms have been made by Kamil Zvelebil and others. Georgiy Starostin criticized them as no closer than correspondences with other nearby language families. For the majority of historical linguists, the Elamo-Dravidian hypothesis remains unproven, and Elamite is generally accepted by scholars to be a language isolate, unrelated to any other known language.

Spread of farming

Apart from the linguistic similarities, the Elamo-Dravidian hypothesis rests on the claim that agriculture spread from the Near East to the Indus Valley region via Elam. This would suggest that agriculturalists brought a new language as well as farming from Elam. Supporting ethno-botanical data include the Near Eastern origin and name of wheat (D. Fuller). Later evidence of extensive trade between Elam and the Indus Valley Civilization suggests ongoing links between the two regions.

Renfrew and Cavalli-Sforza have also argued that Proto-Dravidian was brought to India by farmers from the Iranian part of the Fertile Crescent, but more recently Heggarty and Renfrew noted that "McAlpin's analysis of the language data, and thus his claims, remain far from orthodoxy", adding that Fuller finds no relation of Dravidian languages with other languages, and thus assumes it to be native to India. Renfrew and Bahn conclude that several scenarios are compatible with the data, and that "the linguistic jury is still very much out".

Narasimhan et al. (2019) conclude that the Iranian ancestral component in the IVC people was contributed by people related to but distinct from Iranian agriculturalists, lacking the Anatolian farmer-related ancestry which was common in Iranian farmers after 6000 BCE. Those Iranian farmers-related people may have arrived in the Indus Valley before the advent of farming there, and mixed with people related to Indian hunter-gatherers ca. 5400 to 3700 BCE, before the advent of the mature IVC. Sylvester et al. (2019) noted that (referring to Renfrew (1996)) "the existence of Brahui speakers, solitary Dravidian language speakers in Balochistan in Pakistan, supports the Elamo-Dravidian hypothesis", and concluded that bidirectional migration and admixture occurred during neolithic times.

Notes

References

Sources

Further reading
 
 
 
 

Dravidian languages
Elamite language
Proposed language families